The High Commissioner from New Zealand to Australia is New Zealand's foremost diplomatic representative in the Commonwealth of Australia, and in charge of New Zealand's diplomatic mission in Australia.

The High Commission is located in Canberra, Australia's capital city.  New Zealand has maintained a resident High Commissioner in Australia since 1943.

As fellow members of the Commonwealth of Nations, diplomatic relations between New Zealand and Australia are at governmental level, rather than between Heads of State.  Thus, the countries exchange High Commissioners, rather than ambassadors.

List of heads of mission

High Commissioners to Australia

 Carl Berendsen (1943–1944)
 Jim Barclay (1944–1950)
 George Edwin Alderton (1950–1958)
 Fred Jones (1958–1961)
 Sydney Cuthbert Johnston (1961–1963)
 Jack Shepherd (1963–1964)
 J L Hazlett (1964–1970)
 Arthur Yendell (1970–1973)
 E P Chapman (1973–1976)
 Sir Laurie Francis (1976–1985)
 Graham Ansell (1985–1989)
 Ted Woodfield (1989–1994)
 Graham Fortune (1994–1999)
 Simon Murdoch (1999–2002)
 Kate Lackey (2002–2006)
 John Larkindale (2006–2011)
 Martyn Dunne (2011–2013)
 Chris Seed (2013–2018)
 Dame Annette King (2018–present)

Notes

References

 
 Chris Seed named NZ's next High Commissioner to Australia.  The New Zealand Herald, 24 October 2013.  Retrieved on 2014-04-28.

Australia and the Commonwealth of Nations
Australia, High Commissioners from New Zealand to
New Zealand
 
New Zealand and the Commonwealth of Nations